is a passenger railway station in the city of Yachiyo, Chiba, Japan, operated by the third sector railway operator Tōyō Rapid Railway.

Lines
Murakami Station is a station on the Tōyō Rapid Railway Line, and is 15.2 km from the starting point of the line at Nishi-Funabashi Station.

Station layout 
The station consists of two elevated opposed side platforms with the station building underneath.

Platforms

History
Murakami Station was opened on April 27, 1996.

Passenger statistics
In fiscal 2018, the station was used by an average of 5,952 passengers daily.

Surrounding area
Yachiyo Municipal Folk Museum
Yachiyo Picture-letter Museum
Chiba Prefectural Yachiyo Higashi High School
Yachiyo Municipal Murakami Junior High School
Yachiyo Municipal Murakami Higashi Junior High School
Yachiyo Municipal Murakami Elementary School

See also
 List of railway stations in Japan

References

External links

 Tōyō Rapid Railway Station information 

Railway stations in Japan opened in 1996
Railway stations in Chiba Prefecture
Yachiyo, Chiba